Lixu is a town of Dongxiang District, Fuzhou, in northeastern Jiangxi province, China. , it has 3 residential communities and 9 villages under its administration.

See also 
 List of township-level divisions of Jiangxi

References 

Fuzhou, Jiangxi
Township-level divisions of Jiangxi